Charles Warren Potter (18 April 1851 – 6 June 1895) was an English first-class cricketer active 1869–71 who played for Surrey. He was born in Albury; died in Shamley Green.

References

1851 births
1895 deaths
English cricketers
Surrey cricketers